{{Infobox election
| election_name = 2004 United States Senate election in Vermont
| country = Vermont
| type = presidential
| ongoing = no
| previous_election = 1998 United States Senate election in Vermont
| previous_year = 1998
| next_election = 2010 United States Senate election in Vermont
| next_year = 2010
| election_date = November 2, 2004
| image_size = x150px
| image1 = Patrick Leahy official photo.jpg
| nominee1 = Patrick Leahy
| party1 = Democratic Party (United States)
| popular_vote1 = 216,972
| percentage1 = 70.6%
| image2 = 3x4.svg
| nominee2 = Jack McMullen
| party2 = Republican Party (United States)
| popular_vote2 = 75,398
| percentage2 = 24.5%
| map                = 
| map_caption = Leahy:      McMullen:  
| title = U.S. Senator
| before_election = Patrick Leahy
| before_party = Democratic Party (United States)
| after_election = Patrick Leahy
| after_party = Democratic Party (United States)
}}

The 2004 United States Senate election in Vermont''' was held on November 2, 2004. Incumbent Democratic U.S. Senator Patrick Leahy won reelection to a sixth term.

Democratic primary

Candidates 
 Patrick Leahy, incumbent U.S. Senator
 Craig Hill, perennial candidate

Results

Republican primary

Candidates 
 Jack McMullen, businessman
 Peter D. Moss
 Ben Mitchell

Results

General election

Candidates

Major 
 Patrick Leahy (D), incumbent U.S. Senator
 Jack McMullen (R), businessman

Minor 
 Cris Ericson (I), perennial candidate
 Craig Hill (G), electronics marketer
 Ben Mitchell (LU)
 Keith Stern (I)

Predictions

Polling

Results

See also 
 2004 United States Senate elections

References 

2004 Vermont elections
Vermont
2004